Croxley Danes School is a co-educational secondary school and sixth form currently located in Rickmansworth, Hertfordshire.

Admissions 
Croxley Danes is an all-ability academy school, with the majority of students admitted based on the proximity of their home to the school. Priority is given to children of staff and siblings of current students, however, up to 10% of students are admitted based upon their performance in a musical aptitude test.

Location 
The permanent school site is located on Baldwins Lane, Croxley Green, with an area of 33 acres. It is approximately half a mile (0.8 km) from Croxley tube station.

History 
The school was given approval for opening in February 2017 by the Department for Education, and opened in September 2017 in temporary accommodation on the site of St Clement Danes School. The old maths block of the school was refurbished to provide separate facilities for the Croxley Danes students, with 120 new year 7 pupils admitted in the first year.

In September 2018, a further 180 students were admitted and the school moved to temporary accommodation in Tolpits Lane, occupying the former site of the Reach Free School, whilst the permanent site was being completed. This move was carried out instead of building temporary buildings on the permanent site to accommodate the students.

The transfer of the school to the permanent site on Baldwins Lane was planned to take place at the end of the Easter term in 2020, but delays meant that the transfer will instead occur over the school summer holidays, with pupils first attending the new site in September 2020.

Houses 
The names of each of the school houses are related to the history of the school site or to the local Croxley Green area. Cassiobridge and Snells are named after former houses located on the site, whilst Jaggerts and Mallets are former names of fields. The land was previously owned by Gonville and Caius College, Cambridge, giving the name for Gonville house, whilst Dickinson house is named after John Dickinson, who built a paper mill in Croxley between 1828 and 1830.

Current Houses and Colours

References

External links 

 Croxley Danes School | Get Information About Schools (GIAS)
 Croxley Danes School | Hertfordshire County Council

Free schools in England
Educational institutions established in 2017
Schools in Three Rivers District
Secondary schools in Hertfordshire
2017 establishments in England